is a Japanese road and track cyclist.  For road racing, he lastly rode for UCI Continental team . He won the silver medal in the team pursuit at the 2016 Asian Cycling Championships.
Since 2022 he's a Keirin racer.

References

External links

1992 births
Living people
Japanese track cyclists
Japanese male cyclists
Place of birth missing (living people)
Cyclists at the 2014 Asian Games
Cyclists at the 2018 Asian Games
Asian Games medalists in cycling
Medalists at the 2014 Asian Games
Medalists at the 2018 Asian Games
Asian Games bronze medalists for Japan